Chicken mull is a traditional dish from North Carolina, upstate South Carolina and Georgia. It is a type of stew consisting of parboiled whole chicken in a cream- or milk-based broth, butter and seasoned with salt, pepper and other ingredients. Traditionally, the stew is served in the late fall and winter months. In northern Georgia, this part of the year is often referred to as "mull season". Often the term "chicken stew" or "chicken mull" refers to an event or gathering where the dish is served.

Preparation
Recipes for chicken mull vary slightly from person to person, but it is usually made by first cooking a whole chicken by boiling or parboiling, allowing a rich broth to form. The chicken is then removed from the pot and the meat is pulled from the bones or cut off with a knife. The skin, bones and fat are removed as well. Sometimes boneless, skinless chicken breasts are used instead of a whole chicken. A thickening of milk or cream is made (and sometimes evaporated milk is added as well) and added to the broth. Several sleeves of saltine crackers can be crumbled into broth and chicken mixture as it is the more common method of thickening the mull. The chicken is usually ground up in a meat grinder, although sometimes it is cut into small pieces.  The chicken is then added back into the liquid along with salt, pepper and butter or margarine.  Various other ingredients may be added to the stew according to local tradition, (such as diced potatoes or onions); a more common addition is varying amounts of hot sauce.

The stew varies in color from white to pale yellow, depending on the amount of butter or margarine used. It can vary in thickness from very thin and soup-like to thick and creamy. Saltine crackers are commonly served with chicken mull, either on the side or crumbled into the bowl.
Other, nearly identical variations of a "mull" can be made using either catfish, oysters or canned salmon, instead of chicken.

Cultural traditions
Because of its low cost of preparation and reputation as a local comfort food, chicken mull is often served at large social gatherings such as church fellowships, family reunions and community fundraisers.

It is a tradition at these gatherings to prepare the mull in a large cast iron or stainless steel pot, often outdoors over an open fire. Bowls of mull are sometimes complemented with coleslaw, rice or grilled cheese sandwiches.

In North Carolina and Georgia, "chicken mulls" or "chicken stews" are social events usually held during the colder seasons, with most events occurring September through December.

See also

 List of chicken dishes
 List of stews
 Supreme (cookery)

References

North Carolina culture
Cuisine of the Southern United States
American stews
American chicken dishes
Georgia (U.S. state) culture
Milk dishes